Bruce Reznick (born February 3, 1953 in New York City) is an American mathematician long on the faculty at the University of Illinois at Urbana–Champaign.  He is a prolific researcher noted for his contributions to number theory and the combinatorial-algebraic-analytic investigations of polynomials.  In July 2019, to mark his 66th birthday, a day long symposium "Bruce Reznick 66 fest: A mensch of Combinatorial-Algebraic Mathematics" was held at the University of Bern, Switzerland.

Education and career
Reznick got his B.S. in 1973 from the California Institute of Technology and his Ph.D. in 1976 from Stanford University under Per Enflo for the thesis "Banach Spaces Which Satisfy Linear Identities".

He was a Sloan Fellow (1983–1986) and is a fellow of the American Mathematical Society (AMS). From 1983 to 1985 he was on the Putnam Competition Preparation Committee of the Mathematical Association of America (MAA). As an undergraduate he had been a member of the first place team in the Putnam Competition twice, also being ranked twice in the top ten as an individual 

Reznick is a frequent author on matters relating to teaching and mentoring, and the overall training of graduate students.  He wrote the popular article "Chalking It Up: Advice to a New TA".

Research
Reznick has done a systematic analysis of the representation of real forms of even degree as sums of powers of linear forms.  This work was described in his monograph Sum of Even Powers of Real Linear Forms (Memoirs of the American Mathematical Society, 1992)

Reznick specializes in combinatorial methods in algebra, analysis and number theory, often involving polynomials, polytopes and integer sequences.  He is known for his contributions to the study of sums of squares and positivity of polynomials. In joint work with M.D. Choi and T. Y. Lam, he developed the Gram matrix method for writing real polynomials as sums of squares; this method has important applications to other areas of mathematics including optimization.

Awards
 2013 fellow of the American Mathematical Society
 2008-2009 Campus Award for Excellence in Undergraduate Teaching in the University of Illinois at Urbana-Champaign
 Reznick has an Erdős–Bacon number of 3 which puts him in a tie for the lead with MIT math professor Daniel Kleitman.

Selected publications

References

External links
 
 Bruce Reznick's homepage

20th-century American mathematicians
21st-century American mathematicians
Number theorists
Combinatorialists
Fellows of the American Mathematical Society
Sloan Research Fellows
University of Illinois Urbana-Champaign faculty
California Institute of Technology alumni
Stanford University alumni
People from New York City
1953 births
Living people